The 2010 season was the West Coast Eagles' 24th season in the AFL. The Eagles finished 16th and last to record their first wooden spoon in the competition, just four years after their premiership season of 2006. West Coast played 22 games, including 12 at Subiaco Oval, winning just four and losing the remaining eighteen.

Pre-season

Trades

West Coast traded Brent Staker and draft picks 39 and 55 to Brisbane in exchange for Bradd Dalziell, and then traded Mark Seaby to Sydney in exchange for draft picks 22 and 118. Sydney then traded Amon Buchanan to Brisbane in exchange for pick 28.

Draft selections

National draft selections
7 - Brad Sheppard (East Fremantle)
22 - Gerrick Weedon (Claremont)
23 - Koby Stevens (Gippsland Power)
Pre-season draft selections
5 - Ryan Neates (Claremont)
Rookie draft selections
11 - Lewis Broome (Claremont)
27 - Andrew Strijk (West Perth)
40 - Ashton Hams (South Fremantle)
53 - Jarrad Oakley-Nicholls

NAB Cup
Home team's score listed in bold.

List

Squad

Leadership group
The leadership group was composed of the captain Darren Glass, Dean Cox, Shannon Hurn, Josh Kennedy, Matt Priddis, Adam Selwood and Beau Waters. During the games when Glass was injured, all of these players rotated the captaincy.

Results

Ladder

Awards

League awards
Mark LeCras was selected in the forward pocket for the 2010 All-Australian team.
Nic Naitanui was nominated for the 2010 AFL Rising Star Award.
Mark LeCras placed third in the Coleman Medal, scoring 63 goals for the season.
Matt Priddis received the most votes for the club in the 2010 Brownlow Medal, receiving 13 votes out of the club's total of 31 votes.

Club awards
The 2010 West Coast Eagles Club Champion Awards were held on Saturday, 11 September at Crown Perth. Mark LeCras was named Club Champion, Mark Nicoski received the Best Clubman award and Nic Naitanui was awarded Rookie of the Year. Mark LeCras was also leading goal-kicker, kicking 63 goals for the year. Josh Kennedy was next, with 41 goals. The voting for the Club Champion Award went as follows:

Season records and milestones

Team records
Highest home attendance: 40 886 vs.  at Subiaco Oval, 2 May
Highest away attendance: 38 781 vs. Collingwood at Etihad Stadium, 3 July
Highest team score for: 20.12 (132) vs.  at Etihad Stadium, 17 July
Lowest team score for: 7:10 (52) vs. Collingwood at Etihad Stadium, 3 July
Lowest team score against: 6.10 (46) by Melbourne at the MCG, 15 May
Most consecutive wins: 2 (rounds 7 and 8)
Most consecutive losses: 7 (between rounds 9 and 15)
Highest score by quarter:
1st quarter - 6.5 (41) vs.  at Etihad Stadium, 10 April
2nd quarter - 6.4 (40) vs.  at Etihad Stadium, 17 July
3rd quarter - 6.2 (38) vs.  at Etihad Stadium, 17 July
4th quarter - 5.4 (34) vs.  at Subiaco Oval, 8 May
Source: AFL Tables

Player records
Most games: 22 - Dean Cox, Brad Ebert, Josh J. Kennedy and Nic Naitanui
Most goals: 63 - Mark LeCras
Most goals in a game: 12.2 - Mark LeCras vs  at Etihad Stadium, 17 July
Most kicks: 267 - Brad Ebert
Most kicks in a game: 21 - Shannon Hurn vs  at Subiaco Oval, 5 June
Most handballs: 336 - Matt Priddis
Most handballs in a game: 29 - Matt Priddis vs  at Subiaco Oval, 23 May
Most possessions: 488 - Matt Priddis
Most possession in a game: 36 - Matt Priddis vs  at Etihad Stadium, 10 April
Most contested possessions: 226 - Matt Priddis
Most marks: 146 - Beau Waters
Most marks in a game: 17 - Beau Waters vs  at Subiaco Oval, 5 June
Most contested marks: 28 - Josh J. Kennedy
Most Inside-50s: 84 - Andrew Embley
Most tackles: 130 - Matt Priddis
Most tackles in a game: 15 - Matt Priddis vs  at Subiaco Oval, 2 May
Most hit-outs: 502 - Dean Cox
Most hit-outs in a game: 35 - Dean Cox vs AFL Haw at Subiaco Oval, 8 May
Source: West Coast Eagles 2010 Statistics

Milestones
Andrew Embley played his 200th game.
Dean Cox played his 200th game.
Brett Jones played his 100th game.
Josh J. Kennedy played his 50th game, and his 50th game for the Eagles.
Brad Ebert played his 50th game.

Debuts
Luke Shuey (round 1)
Ashton Hams (round 4)
Lewis Stevenson (round 5)
Brad Sheppard (round 7)
Andrew Strijk (round 13)
Koby Stevens (round 13)
Ashley Smith (round 15)
Jordan Jones (round 21)

References

External links
West Coast Eagles 2010 Statistics
AFL Tables West Coast Eagles 2010 Season

West Coast Eagles
West Coast Eagles seasons
West Coast Eagles